Kijevo is a Croatian and Serbian toponym that may refer to:

Kijevo, Croatia, a village and a municipality in Šibenik-Knin County
Kijevo, Sanski Most, a village in the municipality of Sanski Most, Federation of Bosnia and Herzegovina, Bosnia and Herzegovina
Kijevo, Trnovo, a village in the municipality of Trnovo, city of East Sarajevo, Republika Srpska, Bosnia and Herzegovina
Kijevo, Batočina, a village in the municipality of Batočina, Šumadija District, Serbia
Kijevo, Belgrade, a suburb of Belgrade, Serbia
, a village in the municipality of Klina, Peć District, Kosovo
Kijevo, Mališevo, a village in the municipality of Mališevo, Prizren District, Kosovo

Notes

See also
Kijevci (disambiguation)
Kiev (disambiguation)